Victor William (Peter) Watson (14 September 1908 – 3 May 1956) was a wealthy English art collector and benefactor. He funded the literary magazine, Horizon, edited by Cyril Connolly.

Life and work
Watson was the son of William George Watson, later Sir George Watson, 1st Baronet, and was the youngest of three children—his brother Norman was born in 1897 and sister Florence in 1894. He was educated at Lockers Park School, Eton College and St John's College, Oxford.

Watson was an avid art collector acquiring works by such artists as Miró, Klee, and Pablo Picasso, which were displayed in his Paris apartment in the 1930s. He was the principal benefactor of the Institute of Contemporary Arts in London and also provided financial assistance to English and Irish painters including Francis Bacon, Lucian Freud and John Craxton. In 1930, society photographer, artist and set designer Sir Cecil Beaton began a lifelong obsession with Watson, though the two never became lovers. One chapter from Hugo Vickers' authorized biography of Cecil Beaton is titled "I Love You, Mr. Watson".

In 1940 Watson provided funding for Cyril Connolly's Horizon and became its arts editor. Stephen Spender was also involved with the magazine initially. Watson was art editor for the magazine between 1940 and 1949.  He rarely contributed articles, but gave many opportunities for his friends to have their pictures reproduced in the magazine, and also encouraged Horizon to look beyond British Art, particularly to Paris.  Watson commissioned articles on artists barely known at the time in England, such as Balthus, Morandi and Klee.  He persuaded Picasso's dealer, Daniel Kahnweiler, to comment on the contemporary art market;  and he also got Michel Leiris to write about Giacometti. Spender recalled to Connolly's biographer, Clive Fisher, that Watson hated "priggishness, pomposity and almost everything to do with public life," and he suspected that he had educated himself "through a love of beautiful works and of people in whom he saw beauty ...". He added "When I think of him then, I think of his clothes, which were beautiful, his general neatness and cleanness, which seemed almost those of a handsome young Bostonian."

Fisher writes that Peter Watson "was a figure of striking attractiveness; women in particular seem to have found his manners irresistible... almost everyone appears to have liked him." One of Watson's lovers was the American male prostitute and socialite Denham Fouts, whom he continued to support even after they separated as a result of Fouts's drug addiction

Watson was found drowned in his bath on 3 May 1956 at his home in Knightsbridge, London. Some have suggested that he was murdered by his young American lover, Norman Fowler (11 May 1927– March 23, 1971). Fowler inherited the bulk of Watson's estate and died 14 years later in the West Indies; he was also found drowned in his bathtub.

Watson's sister, Florence Nagle, was a race horse breeder and trainer.  His brother Sir Norman Watson, Baronet, (1897 - 1989), provided funding for the early development of Lake Louise, a ski resort in Alberta, Canada.

Notes and references

English art collectors
1908 births
1956 deaths
English LGBT people
People educated at Eton College
People educated at Lockers Park School
Deaths by drowning
20th-century LGBT people